Melmerby is a village and civil parish in the Eden district, in the county of Cumbria, England. It is a small village with a population of around 200. The village is 9 miles to the east of Penrith, a thriving community with immediate access to Junction 40 of the M6 motorway and a main line railway station serving London, Manchester, Edinburgh and Glasgow. Surrounded by countryside it sits between the North Pennines with its highest point, Cross Fell to the east and the World Heritage Lake District National Park 10 miles to the west. In 1931 the parish had a population of 175.

Governance 
On 1 April 1934 the parish was merged into Ousby, on 1 April 2019 Melmerby became a separate parish again.

History

Melmerby is supposed to have taken its name from the residence of Máel Muire, a presumed Norse-Gael who lived nearby in the 9th century. The most significant historic buildings surviving in the village today are the 13th century church of St John the Baptist and the Grade II Listed Melmerby Hall, begun as a defensive structure in the early 14th century. A petition received by Edward II between 1320 and 1326 reads:

"John le Denum petitions the King that whereas he has a castle in Cumberland called Melmerby Tower, which could be kept by a dozen men at arms, he has kept it until now and has often been assailed by the Scots to their great loss, and John's lands are so devastated there and elsewhere that he can no longer bear the expense. He craves help in the form of wages or otherwise until times change, because all the country around would suffer great loss peril and loss if it were taken through lack of garrison."

The hall, built from the local red sandstone, was extended in the 17th century and again in the 18th century in a Georgian style. The  grounds include an archery lawn, walled vegetable gardens, a Victorian castle folly and wooded areas. Features inside include a priest hole and a large inglenook fireplace.

Modern Melmerby

Melmerby has one Egon Ronay Guide-listed eatery: the Village Bakery, known for its breads and cakes made with organic, stoneground flour. Village residents formed a consumer co-operative and opened a village shop in 2005, that featured on the BBC's Working Lunch.  The shop closed in 2008; however, it is now (Jan 2016) open and providing a great service to the village community as a shop, cafe and accommodation..

The area is popular with ramblers. Melmerby Fell is very close and Cross Fell, the highest part of the Pennines, is only three or four miles (6 km) away.

The A686 road passes through the village, and was described in AA Magazine by travel journalist Phil Llewellin:
"England's great wilderness sprawls across the northern Pennines, where the mountains have fascinating names such as Fiend's Fell and Wildboar Fell. Penrith merits a visit after leaving the M6, and memories of the motorway fade as the A686 crosses the River Eden valley.
The road leads to Alston, which claims to be England's highest market town, a charming little place with cobbled streets and quaint buildings. The A686 beyond Alston crosses another breathtaking expanse of windswept upland before running down to the River Allen's beautiful wooded gorge."

Melmerby Fell is a prominent feature of the area.

See also

Listed buildings in Ousby

References

External links 

 Cumbria County History Trust: Melmerby (nb: provisional research only – see Talk page)
 www.visitcumbria.com Melmerby page
 Melmerby Parish Council Website

Villages in Cumbria
Civil parishes in Cumbria
Eden District